The Muisca were a people living in the central highlands of Colombia; the Altiplano Cundiboyacense and neighbouring valleys. The variation of climates and ecozones within their territories made the Muisca excellent farmers. Over time, various species of flora and fauna have been discovered in Colombia. This list contains the living genera and species and fossils named after the Muisca, their religion or their settlements.

Three other Muisca etymologies are recognised; Thomagata Patera, named after mythological cacique Thomagata, and Bochica Patera are volcanoes on Io and BD Bacatá is the highest skyscraper of Colombia.

List of flora and fauna named after the Muisca

See also 

 List of Muisca toponyms
 Muisca
 Biodiversity of Colombia, Chibcha language, Bogotá savanna, Altiplano Cundiboyacense

References 

Flora and fauna
Muisca
Muisca
Muisca
Muisca
¤
Flora and fauna